Margarita Guerrero was an Argentinean dancer and writer. She is known for her collaborations with Jorge Luis Borges, with whom she co-wrote and edited Book of Imaginary Beings and El "Martín Fierro". As his eyesight failed, Borges relied increasingly on collaborators in creating his work, and Guerrero's role in Book of Imaginary Beings in particular is thought to have been that of a researcher and compiler.

Borges dedicated Other Inquisitions, 1937–1952 to her under the name "Margot Guerrero".

She was interested in the occult.

References 

20th-century Argentine writers
20th-century Argentine women writers
Argentine female dancers
Jorge Luis Borges
Year of birth missing (living people)